The Baxter's Curve Train Robbery, also known as the Sanderson Train Robbery, occurred in 1912 near the town of Sanderson, Texas. Ben Kilpatrick and his partner, Ole Hobek, attempted to rob a Southern Pacific express car, but they were stopped by one of their hostages, David A. Trousdale, who managed to kill both of the bandits.

Background
Ben Kilpatrick, known as the "Tall Texan", was originally a member of Butch Cassidy's Wild Bunch, but he was caught after the 1901 Great Northern Robbery in Montana and sent to the federal prison in Atlanta, Georgia. Upon his release, exactly ten years after the Great Northern Robbery, Ben went straight back to a life of crime.

Old West historians have often written Ben Kilpatrick off as being entirely unable to commit a robbery without the help of Butch Cassidy or Kid Curry, but after his release from prison, a man named Ole Hobek and he executed a series of "spectacular" bank and train robberies within a short time. The robberies did not yield much gain, though, which necessitated further robberies.

Little is known about Hobek's life prior to his release from prison, where he is believed to have met Ben. However, anticipating Ben's release, he made an appearance in West Texas in the spring of 1911. Claiming to be a detective, he shared a hack with two men from San Angelo who were taking a trip to Sheffield. Once there, Hobek disappeared without paying his share of the bill. Investigators later determined that he contacted someone in Christoval, where some of Ben's relatives lived. Hobek was next seen in Memphis, Tennessee, where he was working for the L.B. Price Mercantile Company from July 1911 until February 5, 1912.

The robbery
At about 12:05 am, March 13, 1912, Kilpatrick and Hobek boarded Southern Pacific's Train #9 in Dryden and rode it west towards Sanderson. Once they were out of town, the two robbers put on masks and made their way to the front of the train to take the engineer, D. E. Grosh, two of his crewmen, and the express messenger hostage. The robbers then ordered the engineer to stop the train at the first iron bridge west of Baxter's Curve, which was located roughly midway between Dryden and Sanderson and was where they had left their horses.

While Kilpatrick was holding the engineer at gunpoint, Hobek went to the express car with the express messenger, David A. Trousdale, and the two crewmen, to disconnect the following cars and commence the actual robbery. Along the way, Trousdale managed to arm himself with an ice mallet that was used for a shipment of frozen oysters. He concealed it upon his person until an opportune moment. A few minutes later, as Hobek was looking down to pick up a package, Trousdale struck him in the head with the mallet and killed him.

Trousdale then armed himself with Hobek's rifle and gave pistols to the two crewmen. They then turned out the lights and went to the back of the car to wait for Kilpatrick to show himself. According to Trousdale, they waited over an hour before he became impatient and decided to make his way to the express car. When he appeared in the window of the express car, Kilpatrick called out the name "Frank" a few times, but was then shot in the head by Trousdale without ever seeing him.

Aftermath
With the robbery thwarted, the engineer restarted the engine, reconnected with the other half of the train, and then drove to Sanderson, where the sheriff of Terrell County was informed. The sheriff, David L. Anderson, who was notable for having been a member of Billy the Kid's gang, later captured a third accomplice in the robbery attempt; an 11-year-old boy who was recruited to hold the horses at Baxter's Curve. The bandits' horses were found to have been shod backwards, presumably so that when they made their escape their tracks would appear to be going the opposite way.

The train arrived in Sanderson about 5:00 am. The bodies of Kilpatrick and Hobek were immediately removed from the train and propped up in front of the depot for their now-famous photograph. After the photograph was taken, the bodies were wrapped in sheets and placed together in a large wooden coffin. Kilpatrick and Hobek were originally buried in an unmarked plot at the Cedar Grove Cemetery, but their grave has since been discovered and is now a popular tourist attraction.

David Trousdale was regarded as a hero, and as a reward, he was presented with $1,000 and an engraved gold watch from Wells Fargo & Company. He also received another $1,000 from the federal government, $500 from the Southern Pacific Railroad, and a gold watch fob inlaid with a diamond inside the star of Texas from grateful passengers. The engraving on the watch said "In recognition of the courage and fidelity displayed in an attempted train robbery near Dryden, Texas, March 13, 1912, Wells Fargo and Co." The fob said "Presented by passengers, west-bound Sunset Express, for bravery displayed March 13, 1912, near Dryden, Texas."

Although the Baxter's Curve Train Robbery is sometimes considered to be the last train robbery in Texas history, the Newton Gang robbed a Southern Pacific train near Uvalde in 1914.

David A. Trousdale's account
The following was reported by David A. Trousdale to the police in Sanderson:

See also

 List of Old West gunfights

References

1912 in Texas
1912 crimes in the United States
Conflicts in 1912
Train robberies
Robberies in the United States
Crimes in Texas
1912 in rail transport
March 1912 events